In partner dancing, open position refers to positions in which partners are connected primarily at the hands as opposed to closer body contact, as in closed position.  The connection is through the hands, wrists, and fingers, and relies heavily on frame and the compression and tension of both partners' arms.  

We Many forms of dancing use the open position.  Modern Jive, East Coast Swing, West Coast Swing, Lindy Hop, and Latin are primary examples, but an open position is used in waltz, country, and other styles at times.

Partner dance technique